Christiaan Varenhorst (born 6 May 1990) is a Dutch beach volleyball player.

He competed at the 2016 Summer Olympics in Rio de Janeiro, in the men's beach volleyball tournament with partner Reinder Nummerdor. Varenhorst specializes as a blocker.

References

External links

1990 births
Living people
Dutch men's beach volleyball players
Olympic beach volleyball players of the Netherlands
Beach volleyball players at the 2016 Summer Olympics
Beach volleyball blockers
21st-century Dutch people